Guy Smit (born 19 January 1996) is a Dutch footballer who plays as a goalkeeper for Icelandic club Valur Reykjavík.

Club career
Born in Doetinchem, Gelderland, Smit joined the youth academy of Dutch top flight side Vitesse at the age of 17 after playing for the youth academy of DZC '68 in the Dutch seventh division.

In 2016, he signed for Dutch second division club FC Eindhoven after trialing for Arsenal, one of the most successful teams in England, where he made 3 league appearances and scored 0 goals and suffered a double fracture. On 12 April 2019, Smit debuted for FC Eindhoven during a 1-2 loss to Roda JC. After that, he almost signed for an English outfit.

In 2020, he signed for Leiknir in the Icelandic second division after receiving an offer from Cypriot side Ermis Aradippou, helping them achieve promotion to the Icelandic top flight.

In the fall of 2021 he signed for Icelandic giants Valur, set to replace former Icelandic national goalkeeper Hannes Þór Halldórsson.

References

External links
 
 

1996 births
Living people
Dutch footballers
Dutch expatriate footballers
People from Doetinchem
Footballers from Gelderland
Association football goalkeepers
NEC Nijmegen players
FC Eindhoven players
Leiknir Reykjavík players
Valur (men's football) players
Eerste Divisie players
Úrvalsdeild karla (football) players
1. deild karla players
Expatriate footballers in Iceland
Dutch expatriate sportspeople in Iceland